The following lists events that happened during 1962 in Rwanda.

Incumbents 
 President: Grégoire Kayibanda (starting 1 July)

Events

July
 July 1 - Rwanda gains its independence from Belgium.

References

 
Years of the 20th century in Rwanda
1960s in Rwanda
Rwanda
Rwanda